John Walls may refer to:
 John Walls (cricketer)
 John Walls (priest)
 John Abbet Walls, American engineer and businessman

See also
 John Wall (disambiguation)